Birdice Blye-Richardson (March 24, 1871 - June 23, 1935) better known as Birdie Blye, was an American pianist. At 5 year old she was "an infant prodigy" who was taught by the best teachers in the United States and Europe. At the age of 10, she gave concerts in London and other European cities. She was the only American who ever played at so early an age in orchestral concerts.

She began her training in New York City under Edmund Neupert and Rafael Joseffy. She then went to the Royal Academy of Music in London. After returning to the U.S., she played concerts in Eastern cities with the Seidl Orchestra. Anton Seidl and William Steinway advised her to study in Germany, which she did for six years, first under Hans von Bülow, then in the Royal Hochschule in Berlin, and finally under Anton Rubinstein. She was the only American pupil Rubinstein ever took. She was twice a guest at the White House in Washington, D.C.

Early years and education
Birdice Blye was born in Sioux City, Iowa, on March 24, 1871. However, she spent so little time in Sioux City, and so much time with her grandmother in Southern Indiana that she considered her home there. By 1887, she was living in Kentland, Indiana.

On her father's side, Blye was related to John Hancock, one of the signers of the Declaration of Independence, and to the Lees of Virginia. Her mother's forefathers were of English nobility.

Blye manifested a love of music at an early age. At age five, she played in concert at Chicago.

For some time, Blye pursued her studies in New York City with Edmund Neupert, Edward Mollenhauer, and Rafael Joseffy. In London, she studied in the Academy, winning medals. After a series of concerts in the principal Eastern cities, where she was received with perfect ovations and where she played with Anton Seidl's orchestra, Mr. Seidl and Mr. William Steinway were so impressed with her wonderful talent that they urged her to go to Germany. In Germany, she studied under Hans von Buelow, in the Royal Hochschule in Berlin, and finally under Anton Rubinstein.

Highly educated, a linguist of note, Blye painted in oils and water colors. She studied painting in the Grosvenor Gallery in London. Her first exhibited picture, painted when she was 14 years of age, was sold for US$75.

Career

Early years
She made her first appearance in New York City in November 1886, at Steinway Hall.

During the nine years of her stay abroad she made concert tours of the principal European cities and besides played again and again at social entertainments for members of the royal families of England and Germany, and such distinguished persons as the Baroness Rothschild, the Empress Eugenie, and Princess Bismarck.

At ten years of age, she made a sensation in London and European cities by her extraordinary playing and won the praise of the severest critics in London, Paris, Dresden, Berlin, Vienna and other great musical centers of the old world. She played before several of the courts of Europe, the principal nobility and most distinguished people, social and artistic, in every city visited.  When eleven years of age, she made her debut in orchestral concerts in London and in Europe with success. She played from memory concertos, sonatas and other compositions by Mendelssohn, Beethoven, Schumann, Liszt, Schubert, and Chopin. She could play the whole clavichord without notes and transpose in every key. She received many certificates and medals, and was feted and admired as the little "wonder child."

In the early 1890s, she played in more than 200 concerts and musicals in American, English and European cities. She was an excellent violinist, a pupil of the Joachim School of Berlin.

Later, she entered studies with Anton Rubinstein, who was enthusiastic in praise of her many musical qualities and introduced her to the prominent musicians of Germany as “the great American pianiste.” Blye wrote her reminiscences of the great master for the Musical Courier and afterwards revised to read before the Authors’ Association and prominent clubs. This and other articles were extensively copied by the press and proved that Blye was also a talented writer. Blye has used the Steinway piano from the very beginning of her career. 

Possibly no American ever enjoyed the friendship of so many distinguished people at home and abroad, and Blye had so many souvenirs of appreciation, gifts from almost every place she has been, and the unique and interesting collection demonstrated that she knew how to value them. Among her hundreds of autograph photographs was one of Longfellow, who named her “the little golden-haired princess.” Bancroft, the historian, sent her baskets of roses from his rose gardens, saving: “Even the roses bloomed brighter in her presence.” There was also a picture of the gallant General Sherman, who gave her a letter to the Ambassador at the Court of St. James, James Russell Lowell, the poet, which read: “I send with this the sweetest poem in the English language, entitled Birdie Blye.”

Later years
On September 18, 1901, she married William B. S. Richardson, M.D., and they made a home in Chicago. 

In 1921, Blye spent three and a half months in California. On her way there, she gave recitals in Texas in Beaumont, Houston, and San Antonio. This was Blye's seventh season in San Antonio, where she has given recitals before leading musical organizations and colleges, and played twice with the Symphony Orchestra, under Arthur Claassen. Dinners and receptions were given in her honor, and Clara Madison dedicated her “Berceuse” to Blye. In California, Blye gave her first recital in San Jose. She appear in San Francisco and Pomonoa. In Los Angeles,  Blye was guest of the Gamut Club at dinner on Ladies' Night; also of the Musicians' Club. She spent several days with Dean and Mrs. Ethelbert Grabill; Dean Grabill dedicated his latest composition to Blye. Dinners were given in her honor by Mr. and Mrs. Homer Grunn, Mr. and Mrs. W. A. Roberts, and Mr. and Mrs. Cassius. In San Francisco Sir Henry Heyman, dean of musicians in California, gave a “coffee” for Blye and presented her with an autographed photograph. Blye renewed her friendship with Mrs. Israel Proctor, whose husband was the California surgeon. She was also guest of Lulu Blumberg, president of the Pacific Musical Society. Blye died June 23, 1935.

Notes

References

Attribution

Bibliography

External links

 Birdie Blye at Wikisource

Musicians from Iowa City, Iowa
1871 births
1935 deaths
19th-century American pianists
19th-century American women pianists
American classical pianists
American biographers
American violinists
American women biographers
American women classical pianists
Women violinists
Wikipedia articles incorporating text from A Woman of the Century
19th-century American women musicians